The 1960–61 Alpha Ethniki was the 25th season of the highest football league of Greece. The season began on 17 September 1960 and ended on 2 July 1961 with the play-off match. Panathinaikos won their second consecutive and fifth Greek title.

The point system was: Win: 3 points - Draw: 2 points - Loss: 1 point.

League table

Results

Top scorers

External links
Hellenic Football Federation 
Rec.Sport.Soccer Statistics Foundation

Alpha Ethniki seasons
Greece
1960–61 in Greek football leagues